The Lubbock-Plainview-Levelland Combined Statistical Area is made up of five counties (Crosby, Hale, Hockley, Lynn, and Lubbock) in the South Plains region of west Texas. As of March 2020, the Lubbock-Plainview-Levelland CSA consists of the Lubbock Metropolitan Statistical Area, the Plainview Micropolitan Statistical Area, and the Levelland Micropolitan Statistical Area. In the 2010 census, the CSA had a population of 350,013, though a July 1, 2019 estimate placed the population at 381,664. The CSA's principal city is Lubbock.

Counties
Crosby
Hale 
Hockley
Lynn
Lubbock

Communities

Places with more than 150,000 people
Lubbock (Principal city)

Places with 15,000 to 25,000 people 

 Plainview

Places with 5,000 to 15,000 people
Levelland
Slaton
Wolfforth

Places with 1,000 to 5,000 people
Abernathy
Anton
Crosbyton
Hale Center
Idalou
Lorenzo
Petersburg
Ralls
Ransom Canyon
Shallowater
Sundown
Tahoka

Places with less than 1,000 people
Buffalo Springs
New Deal
New Home
O'Donnell
Opdyke West
Reese Center
Ropesville
Smyer
Wilson

Unincorporated places
Acuff
Cone
Cotton Center
Grassland
Roosevelt
Slide
Wayside
Whitharral
Woodrow

Ghost town 

 Hale City

Demographics
As of the census of 2000, there were 272,416 people, 103,022 households, and 68,092 families residing within the CSA. The racial makeup of the CSA was 74.03% White, 7.24% African American, 0.60% Native American, 1.17% Asian, 0.04% Pacific Islander, 14.94% from other races, and 1.98% from two or more races. Hispanic or Latino of any race were 28.83% of the population.

The median income for a household in the CSA was $29,684 and the median income for a family was $35,415. Males had a median income of $27,824 versus $19,830 for females. The per capita income for the CSA was $15,597.

See also
List of cities in Texas
Texas census statistical areas
List of Texas metropolitan areas

References

Geography of Lubbock County, Texas
Geography of Crosby County, Texas
Geography of Hockley County, Texas
Geography of Lubbock, Texas
Combined statistical areas of the United States